Bernhard Cornelius Brænne (12 November 1854 - 7 September 1927) was a Norwegian factory owner  and member of the Norwegian Parliament with the Conservative Party.

Background
Brænne was born in  Trondheim, Norway. He was the son of  Johan Sørensen Brænne (1817–71) and Karen Moe (1821–1901). His father was the owner of a factory owner in Trondheim. The factory that he inherited from his father specialized in textile production He graduated as a chemistry engineer from Trondheim Technical College (now Norwegian Institute of Technology) from 1875. He next studied chemistry and mechanical engineering at the Königlich-Sächsisches Polytechnikum (now Dresden University of Technology). In 1878 he took over the family business and expanded it into spinning, weaving and dry cleaning.

Career
Brænne was  involved in local politics in Trondheim as a member of the city council of Trondheim 1891–1910. He served as a member of the Norwegian parliament for several periods between and 1892 and 1918.
He was appointed Minister of Labour in the cabinet of Wollert Konow on 2 February 1910, but then replaced Sofus Arctander as Minister of Trade on 11 June the same year. After the accession of the cabinet of Jens Bratlie on 20 February 1912, Brænne remained in government, again as Minister of Labour, but resigned on 23 August and was replaced by Nils Olaf Hovdenak.

References

External links 
 Bernhard Brænnes private archive existst at NTNU University Library Dorabiblioteket

1854 births
1927 deaths
Politicians from Trondheim
Norwegian Institute of Technology alumni
TU Dresden alumni 
Members of the Storting 
Government ministers of Norway
 Recipients of the St. Olav's Medal
Ministers of Trade and Shipping of Norway